Claudia Österheld (born 8 December 1968 in Kassel) is a West Germany sprint canoer who competed in the late 1980s. At the 1988 Summer Olympics in Seoul, she finished fifth in the K-4 500 m event while being eliminated in the semifinals of the K-2 500 m event.

References
 Sports-reference.com profile

1968 births
Canoeists at the 1988 Summer Olympics
West German female canoeists
Living people
Olympic canoeists of West Germany